The EuroNest Parliamentary Assembly is the inter-parliamentary forum in which members of the European Parliament and the national parliaments of Ukraine, Moldova, Armenia, Azerbaijan and Georgia participate and forge closer political and economic ties with the European Union. It was established in 2011 by the European Commission as a component of the Eastern Partnership. After the elections in Belarus in 2010 were declared as flawed by the OSCE, the membership of Belarus in Euronest was automatically suspended. Belarus is welcome to re-join the Assembly once political requirements have been fulfilled. In 2015, Azerbaijan's membership was suspended due to the European Union's criticism of human rights abuses by the government. In September 2016, it was announced that Azerbaijan would take the necessary steps towards restoring ties. As of 2017, the combined population of Euronest members (excluding Belarus and European Union members) stands at 61,927,521 people.

Member states
In addition to the 27 member states of the European Parliament, five Eastern European states participate:
 Armenia
 Azerbaijan
 Georgia
 Moldova
 Ukraine

Suspended members
 Belarus

Structure
The Assembly is made up of 60 members of the European Parliament and 10 members from the parliaments of each partner country. Plenary sessions are chaired by two co-presidents, one from the European Parliament and one from the partner parliaments. The Bureau of the Assembly is made up of the two co-presidents and eight vice-presidents, four from the European Parliament and four from the partner parliaments. There are four committees and three working groups.

Plenary meetings
The Euronest Parliamentary Assembly meets in plenary once a year. Meeting locations alternate between an Eastern European Partner country and one of the European Parliament places of work (Brussels, Luxembourg or Strasbourg). The committees meets twice a year and working groups meet as required.

EU integration

Members of Euronest have been regarded as belonging to the "European family". All members are part of the European Neighbourhood Policy and each maintain various degrees of integration with the EU. Some members of Euronest such as Ukraine and Georgia are actively seeking eventual EU membership and wish to forge closer ties with the EU. Other states such as Armenia and Moldova cooperate with both the European Union and the Eurasian Economic Union. While Azerbaijan and Belarus have been questioned about their European perspectives due to human rights abuses and lack of freedom of speech.

EU membership perspective
In December 2019, following the eighth plenary meeting held in Tbilisi, a resolution was passed by all members of the Euronest Parliamentary Assembly. The resolution outlines various EU integration goals to be achieved by 2030. The resolution highlights the importance of the Eastern Partnership program and how the initiative supports the six EU associated countries in letting them move more rapidly with reform implementation and deeper political and economic integration with the EU.

The resolution also confirms the successes of the EU Enlargement Policy and its transformative power on Central and Eastern European countries in their development from post-totalitarian regulated economies to European style democracies and that future enlargement shall spread these successes to the Eastern Partnership countries willing to join the EU. The resolution affirms that the process of EU enlargement is open to Eastern Partnership member states and that future enlargement of the EU will be mutually beneficial for both the EU and Eastern Partnership members.

Furthermore, the resolution endorses continuing progressive reforms and harmonization with EU standards, promoting European values and human rights and establishing visa free travel to the EU's Schengen Area for Eastern Partnership members.

The resolution praised the achievements made by Georgia, Moldova and Ukraine in signing Association Agreements and a Deep and Comprehensive Free Trade Area with the EU. Similarly, the resolution endorsed the progress made in Armenia following the 2018 Velvet Revolution. The resolution stated that, "Armenia is the only country in Europe to transition from being a hybrid regime in 2017 to a democracy in 2018" and that the ratification of a new Comprehensive and Enhanced Partnership Agreement (CEPA) by the Armenian Parliament in April
2018 is considered evidence of a strategically reinforced partnership between Armenia and EU. The resolution coined the term "Trio + 1" which represents the three Association Agreements established with Georgia, Moldova and Ukraine, as well as, the CEPA established with Armenia. The resolution calls for promoting further integration efforts between the EU and the "Trio + 1" group over the next decade.

The resolution also acknowledges the potential threat that Russia may have in destabilizing these countries and preventing them from achieving European unity.

See also 
 ACP–EU Joint Parliamentary Assembly
 Armenia–European Union relations
 Association Trio
 Community for Democracy and Rights of Nations
 Community of Democratic Choice
 Council of Europe
 Deep and Comprehensive Free Trade Area
 Euro-Latin American Parliamentary Assembly
 Euro-Mediterranean Parliamentary Assembly - Euronest counterpart for the Euro-Mediterranean Partnership of the ENP
 EU Strategy for the South Caucasus
 Eastern European Group
 Eastern Partnership
 European integration
 Eurosphere
 Eurovoc
 Future enlargement of the European Union
 Organization for Security and Co-operation in Europe
 Politics of Europe
 Post-Soviet states
 TRACECA

References

External links 
 Euronest Parliamentary Assembly web site
 Delegation to the Euronest Parliamentary Assembly (European Parliament)
 Delegation to the Euronest Parliamentary Assembly (ALDE Group)
 Video: Euronest - how it works (EuroparlTV)

Parliamentary assemblies
European Union and third organisations
International organizations based in Europe
European integration
Pan-Europeanism
Armenia–European Union relations
Georgia (country)–European Union relations
Moldova–European Union relations
Ukraine–European Union relations